Hyderabad - Aurangabad Passenger is a passenger train belonging to South Central Railway zone that runs between Hyderabad Deccan and Aurangabad. It is currently being operated with 57549/57550 train numbers on a daily basis.

Average speed and frequency 

The 57549/Hyderabad - Aurangabad Passenger runs with an average speed of 35 km/h and completes 582 km in 16h 40m. The 57550/Aurangabad - Hyderabad Passenger runs with an average speed of 38 km/h and completes 582 km in 15h 30m.

Route and halts 

The important halts of the train are:

Coach composite 

The train has standard ICF rakes with max speed of 110 kmph. The train consists of 12 coaches:

 3 Sleeper Coaches
 7 General Unreserved
 2 Seating cum Luggage Rake

Traction

Both trains are hauled by a Moula Ali Loco Shed based WDG-3A diesel locomotive from Hyderabad to Aurangabad and vice versa.

Rake Sharing 

The train shares its rake with 57547/57548 Hyderabad - Purna Passenger.

Direction Reversal

Train Reverses its direction 2 times:

See also 

 Hyderabad Deccan railway station
 Aurangabad railway station
 Hyderabad - Purna Passenger

Notes

References

External links 

 57549/Hyderabad - Aurangabad Passenger
 57550/Aurangabad - Hyderabad Passenger

Transport in Hyderabad, India
Transport in Aurangabad, Maharashtra
Rail transport in Telangana
Rail transport in Karnataka
Rail transport in Maharashtra
Slow and fast passenger trains in India